Angelo Starr is an American singer, musician and record producer. He is also the younger brother of the late soul singer Edwin Starr.

Background
Angelo Starr was born in Cleveland, Ohio. His time as a youth was spent in Cleveland as well as Detroit, Michigan, where he would go to see his brother Edwin during the summer school breaks. The reason Starr came to the UK was because of his brother.

One of the fields Starr had worked in is as an audio engineer with the UK hip hop label Kold Sweat Records.

The Team
The Team was Edwin Starr's touring band. It was formed in 1982 by percussionist Clive Hare and bass player Kevin Kendall. Angelo Starr's first involvement with the group came about during the 1990s when he took the place on a show filling in for their absent guitarist. He carried on doing work for them and served as their musical director.
Upon the death of his brother in 2003, he felt he had reached an impasse and did not know if he still wanted to be involved with music. He eventually stepped in to front his brother's touring band The Team which had been around for years. They played at various venues such as the Riverbank Bar & Kitchen, which was part of their concert tour with their end concert in Great Yarmouth in November 2017.

Other music involvement
Starr also contributes as a singer in The AllStars Collective.

Discography

References

External links
 Angelo Starr's Official Website
 Angelo Starr & The Team (aka "The Edwin Starr Band")
 Blues & Soul: The Team: Starr Turn
 The Guardian: Lemar and Angelo Starr’s special musical relationship
 UK Music Reviews: Interview Angelo Starr by Kevin Cooper

Date of birth missing (living people)
Living people
American male singers
Record producers from Ohio
American expatriates in the United Kingdom
Year of birth missing (living people)